The Maifeld is a landscape (a natural region sub-unit) of the Middle Rhine Basin on its western perimeter with the Eifel mountains, southwest of the city of Koblenz. It is known for its gently rolling hills.

Location 
The plain, which lies at about 400 metres above sea level, is divided into the Upper Maifeld (Obermaifeld) south of Mayen in the west, and the rather larger Lower Maifeld (Niedermaifeld) area which adjoins it to the east, southwest of Koblenz. It is comparatively sharply bounded by the rivers Moselle (southeast) and Elz (southwest), while the River Nette in the northwest only forms an approximate boundary.

Its name is probably derived from the Franks, who held assemblies here.

Use 
The Maifeld is almost exclusively used for large-scale grain production. Only a few large farms, which are often hidden between the undulating fields, manage this region. The soils are especially fertile. Towns in the Maifeld are Polch (seat of the Verbandsgemeinde of Maifeld in the county of Mayen-Koblenz, but strictly in the Pellenz (Pellenzhöhe) from a natural regional perspective) and Münstermaifeld.

Natural regions 

The Maifeld is divided as follows:
 (to 291 – Middle Rhine Basin)
 (to 291.2 – Maifeld-Pellenz Hills)
 291.23 Lower Maifeld (east)
 291.230 Lower Maifeld Basin 
 291.231 Lower Maifeld Terrace 
 291.232 Lower Maifeld Heights
 291.24 Upper Maifeld (west)

Sights 
 Eltz Castle in the Elz valley
 Karmelenberg
 Church of St. Martin and St. Severus
 Maifeld Cycleway (former Mayen–Polch–Ochtendung / Polch–Münstermaifeld railway line)

References 

Regions of Rhineland-Palatinate
Mayen-Koblenz
Natural regions of the Middle Rhine area